Area codes 519, 226 and 548 are the telephone area codes in the North American Numbering Plan (NANP) for most of southwestern Ontario.

Area code 519 was created in 1953 by a split of two numbering plan areas (NPAs), from the western portion of 416 and the southwestern portion of 613. In 1957, parts of 519 and 613 formed area code 705. 519 is mostly bounded by area code 905, except for Simcoe County which is bordered by 705. It was overlaid with the new area code 226 on October 21, 2006, at which time ten-digit dialling became mandatory. The third area code, 548, was added on June 4, 2015. Area code 382 has been reserved as a fourth code for the region.

The primary ILEC (Incumbent Local Exchange Carrier) in 519/226/548 is Bell Canada, with numerous other small independent companies that covered vast tracts of rural Ontario. Since competition for service was mandated in 1997, numerous CLECs (Competitive Local Exchange Carrier) have also started serving the region.

History

The area code 226 was first proposed as a result of an exhaustion study conducted in the 1990s. The issue was raised with the CRTC by telecommunications firms and SAIC Canada, and in 1992 a relief plan was approved (Telecom Decision CRTC 2002-25). Although it primarily accepted the industry proposal, the CRTC required a permissive dialling period of four months, with consistent network announcements to consumers, instead of the proposed two-month period. On April 15, 2003, the committee recommended delaying the introduction of the 226 area code from February 19, 2005, to October 21, 2006, primarily as a result of updated forecasts of the 519 NPA exhaustion projections.

The 548 area code was the second area code overlay for the 519 region. The new code was activated on June 4, 2015. Canadian Numbering Administrator (CNA) advised the CRTC on October 12, 2011, that based on the current rate of expansion the current numbering system would be exhausted by January 2017. The CRTC in response developed a relief plan (Telecom Decision CRTC 2012-655) which set the framework for addressing the exhaustion and oversee the addition of an additional overlay number. Area code 382 has been reserved as a fourth code for the region.

The 519/226/548 territory covers a wide area (over 36,000 km2), and no single municipality controlling a majority of the available numbers. In theory, therefore, the 226 overlay area code could have been introduced without breaking seven-digit dialing in any of the NPA 519 communities. This would, however, have required exchange numbers to be issued in a specific pattern. For instance, if (519) 999-9999 were a Windsor number, the same number in the new area code, (226) 999-9999, would have to be issued in London, Guelph, or some other community that would never be a local call to any point in the Windsor area.

While the implementation of 548 had the effect of allocating over 23 million numbers to a region of 2.6 million people, overlays have become the preferred method of relief in Canada, as they are an easy workaround for Canada's number allocation system. Canada does not use number pooling as a relief measure. Each CLEC is allocated blocks of 10,000 numbers (corresponding to a single three-digit prefix) for every rate centre where it offers service, even in the smallest hamlets. While most rate centres don't need nearly that many numbers, once a number is allocated to a carrier and rate centre, it can't be moved elsewhere, even to a larger rate centre.

Area code 382 has been set aside as a fourth area code for the region. It will be implemented on June 17, 2023.

Central office codes
Acton  (226)-298 327 828 901, (519)-853, 929
Alvinston  (226)-471 716 846, (519)- 847 898
Amherstburg  (226)-477, (519)-713 730 736
Arkona  See Lambton Shores
Arthur  (226)-443 524, (519)-848
Atwood  (226)-816, (519)-356
Aylmer  (226)-342 545, (519)-765 773 779
Ayr  (226)-556 642 854, (519)-394 547 632
Baden  (226)-355 855, (519)-214 556 634
Bayfield  (226)-441, (519)-565
Beachville  (519)-423
Belle River  (226)-409 478, (519)-715 728
Blenheim  (226)-291 367, (519)-676
Bothwell  (226)-292 834, (519)-695
Brantford (226)-208 227 250 267 269 368 381 387 388 400 401 403 450 493 583 644 730 802 851 920 922 933 934 937 938 966, (519)-209 304 309 512 516 717 720 732 750 751 752 753 754 755 756 757 758 759 761 770 771 774 802 805 861 865 900
Breslau  (226)-366 632 856, (519)-213 648
Bright's Grove  (226)-469, (519)-869 908
Brussels  (226)-889, (519)-887, (548)-571
Burford  (226)-659, (519)-449
Burgessville  (519)-424
Caledon (519)-316 927
Cambridge is divided into the following local rate centres:
Galt (226)-318 362 474 533 616 765 859 894 895, (519)-231 267 543 618 620 621 622 623 624 629 740
Hespeler (226)-201 218 243 319 341 362 475 566 696 755 860 887 890 924, (519)-212 220 221 222 223 224 230 239 240 241 242 244 248 249 277 651 654 658 700 714 716 841
Preston (226)-204 473 535 865, (519)-201 219 650 653 920 947
Chatham (226)-205 229 281 282 296 312 404 494 542 626 627 671 797 798 799 830 881 882 996, (519)-350 351 352 354 355 358 359 360 365 380 388 397 401 436 437 480 598 784 809 917
Chatsworth (519) -794
Chesley (226)-433, (519) -363
Clifford (519) -327
Clinton (226)-420 447 455 457 532 699, (519)-233 482 606 607
Cottam (519)-839
Corunna  (226)-468, (519)-481 813 862
Courtright  (226)-371 467, (519)-431 867
Delhi  (226)-549, (519)-582
Dorchester (519)-202 268 499
Drayton (226)-223 818 857, (519)-638
Dublin  (226)-302, (519)-345
Dundalk  (226)-274, (519)-923
Dungannon (519)-529
Durham (226)-258 432 702, (519)-369
Embro (519)-475
Elmira  (226)-266 858, (519)-210 669 910
Elora  (226)-369 384 963, (519)-413 846
Erin  (519)-315 833
Essex  (226)-479 602 906, (519)-776 961
Exeter  (226)-393 423 735, (519)-235 297
Fergus  (226)-370 383 449 961, (519)-407 787 843
Flesherton  (519)-924
Forest See Lambton Shores
Glencoe  (226)-427 488 690, (519)-287
Goderich  (226)-222 421 458 543 939 963, (519)-440 441 524 525 605 612 891 955
Gorrie  (519)-335
Grand Bend  See Lambton Shores
Grand Valley  (519)-928
Granton  (519)-225
Guelph  (226)-203 217 251 299 314 326 332 337 343 361 486 500 706 770 780 790 820 821 900 962 971 979, (519)-265 341 362 400 500 515 546 553 710 731 760 763 766 767 780 803 820 821 822 823 824 826 827 829 830 831 835 836 837 838 840 993 994
Hamilton (Community of Lynden only) (519)-647
Hanover (226)-434, (519)-364 506
Harriston  (226)-429, (519)-338 510
Harrow  (226)-207 480, (519)-738
Hepworth  (226)-437, (519)-935
Highgate (226)-295 831, (519)-678
Hillsburgh (519)-308 855
Holstein (519)-334
Ilderton (226)-308, (519)-298 666
Ingersoll (226)-825, (519)-303 425 485 926
Inwood (519)-844
Jarvis (226)-513 630, (519)-587
Kerwood  (519)-247
Kincardine  (226)-396, (519)-396
Kingsville  (519)-712 733
Kitchener-Waterloo  (226)-214 215 220 240 241 243 317 336 338 339 359 399 444 476 499 505 581 592 600 606 646 647 666 673 686 747 748 749 750 751 752 772 789 791 792 800 806 808 812 868 898 929 972 978 986 987 988 989, (519)-208 240 279 340 342 404 465 489 496 497 498 500 501 502 503 504 505 513 514 554 568 569 570 571 572 573 574 575 576 577 578 579 580 581 584 585 588 589 590 591 593 594 597 603 616 635 707 721 722 725 729 741 742 743 744 745 746 747 748 749 772 778 781 783 804 807 880 883 884 885 886 888 893 894 895 896 897 904 954 957 998, (548)-212 219 288 333 480 481 483 484 898
Lambeth (226)-265, (519)-652
Lambton Shores (226)-331 520 521 (519)-238 243 296 786 828 899
LaSalle  (226)-675, (519)-734 970 978
Leamington  (226)-202 286 936, (519)-322 324 325 326 329 398 613
Lion's Head  (519)-793
Listowel (226)-306 430 622 640 767 885, (519)-291 292 418 444 492 815
London (226)-209 213 219 224 234 235 236 237 238 239 260 268 270 271 272 273 289 305 316 358 373 374 376 377 378 380 385 386 448 456 504 559 577 580 582 599 636 663 667 678 680 688 700 701 721 777 781 785 813 884 919 925 926 927 928 968 969 973 977 980 981 982 983 984 985 998, (519)-200 203 204 266 280 281 282 286 317 318 319 430 432 433 434 435 438 439 451 452 453 455 457 471 472 473 474 476 488 494 495 518 520 521 552 601 614 615 617 619 630 636 639 640 641 642 643 645 646 649 657 659 660 661 663 667 668 670 671 672 673 675 679 680 681 685 686 690 691 694 697 701 702 709 719 777 789 808 850 851 852 854 857 858 859 860 868 870 871 872 873 878 902 907 913 914 930 931 932 933 936 937 951 953 963 964
Long Point (519)-586
Lucan  (226)-305, (519)-227
Lucknow  (519)-528, 812
Lynden (226)-731 764, (519)-647
Maidstone  (226)-252, (519)-737
Markdale  (226)- 278 452, (519)-986
Meaford  (226)-245 662, (519)-538
Melbourne  (519)-289
Merlin  (226)-293, (519)-689
Mildmay  (226)-454, (519)-367
Milverton  (226)-439, (519)-595
Mitchell  (226)-303, (519)-348
Monkton  (226)-817, (519)-347
Mount Brydges  (226)-490, (519)-264 559
Mount Forest (226)-445 853 991, (519)-261 313 314 321 323 509 604
Nairn  (226)-329, (519)-232
Neustadt  (226)-428, (519)-799
Newbury  (519)-693
New Dundee  (226)-565 862, (519)-391 413 696
New Hamburg  (226)-333 863, (519)-545 662
Norwich  (226)-325, (519)-468 863
Oil Springs  (226)-372 466, (519)-834
Orangeville (226) -200 259 850 882 916 (519)-215 216 217 278 288 307 415 806 938 939 940 941 942 943
Owen Sound (226)-256 277 279 379 424 568 664 668 884 909 910 923 974, (519)-270 370 371 372 373 374 375 376 377 378 379 387 416 447 470 477
Palmerston (226)-431, (519)-343 417
Paris (226)-225 263 677 733, (519)-302 442
Parkhill  (519)-294 459
 Pelee  (519)-724
Petrolia  (226)-465 738, (519)-882
Port Dover  (519)-583
Port Elgin (226)-453 930 992, (519)-385 386 389 706 708 832
Port Franks  See Lambton Shores
Port Rowan (519)-586
Port Stanley  (226)-658, (519)-782
Ridgetown  (226)-297 364, (519)-674
Ripley  (226)-395, (519)-395
Rockwood  (226)-328 838 902, (519)-605 856
Sarnia (226)-254 313 349 357 402 472 672 718 776 778 784 842 886 932 964, (519)-312 328 330 331 332 333 336 337 339 344 346 381 383 384 402 464 466 479 490 491 541 542 704 918
Sauble Beach  (226)-438, (519)-422
Seaforth  (519)-522 527 600
Sebringville  (519)-393
Shedden  (519)-764
Shelburne  (226)-525, (519)-306 925
Simcoe  (226)-206 330 440 514 534 567 931, (519)-410 420 426 427 428 429 718 909
Stratford  (226)-261 300 354 584 633 766 775 779 786 852 880 921 999  (519)-271 272 273 274 275 276 301 305 508 703 801 814 949
St. Clements  (226)-255 866, (519)-218 407 699
St. Jacobs  (226)-288 867, (519)-206 664 906
St. Marys  (226)-264 301 661, (519)-284
St. Thomas (226)-210 212, (519)-207 631 633 637
Strathroy (226)-726, (519)-205 245 246 299
Southampton (226)-284 435, (519)-483 797
Tara (519)-934
Tavistock (519)-412 655
Tecumseh  (226)-676, (519)-478 735 739 956 979
Teeswater (519)-392
Thamesford  (519)-285 295 557
Thamesville  (226)-249 334, (519)-692
Thedford  See Lambton Shores
Thornbury  (226)-276 665, (519)-599
Thorndale  (226)-561, (519)-461 609
Tilbury  (226)-335 832, (519)-607 682
Tillsonburg (226)-231 351 352 641 970 993, (519)-407 544 550 688 842 983
Tiverton (519)-361 368
Tobermory  (519)-596
Wallaceburg  (226)-746 833, (519)-626 627 628
Walkerton (226)-257 285 436 840 990, (519)-507 540 881 889 901
Wardsville (226)-670, (519)-693
Waterford  (519)-443
Watford  (226)-462 720 848, (519)-849 876
Wellesley  (226)-244 660 869, (519)-406 656
Wheatley (226)-248 484 617 618 619, (519)-825
Wiarton  (226)-439, (519)-534
Windsor (226)-216 221 246 260 280 315 340 344 345 346 347 348 350 356 506 526 620 674 722 757 758 759 773 774 782 783 787 788 805 826 935 946 965 975,  (519)-250 251 252 253 254 255 256 257 258 259 300 419 551 560 561 562 563 564 566 567 790 791 792 796 800 816 817 818 819 890 903 915 916 919 944 945 946 948 960 962 965 966 967 968 969 971 972 973 974 977 979 980 981 982 984 985 987 988 989 990 991 992 995 996 997 999
Wingham  (226)-422 841 995, (519)-357 450 530 531 912
Woodstock  (226)-228 232 242 253 853 883 888, (519)-290 320 421 456 469 532 533 535 536 537 539 602 606 708 788
Wyoming  (226)-307 461, (519)'''-845

See also
List of North American area codes

References

External links
 CNA CO codes: NPA 226, NPA 519, NPA 548
 CRTC Telecom Decision CRTC 2002-25: Area code 519 relief plan
 CRTC Telecom Decision CRTC 2004-62: NPA 519 Relief Plan (Southwestern Ontario) (PDF)
 NANPA Planning Letter 343: NPA 226 to Overlay 519 (PDF)
 Area Code Map of Canada

519
Communications in Ontario
Telecommunications-related introductions in 1953
Telecommunications-related introductions in 2006

ja:500#501 から 520